Thomas Ragon was the eighth Abbot of Vale Royal Abbey, Cheshire. His term of office lasted from 1351 to 1369. His abbacy was predominantly occupied with recommencing the building works at Vale Royal—which had been in abeyance for a decade—and the assertion of his abbey's rights over a satellite church in Llanbadarn Fawr, Ceredigion, which was also claimed by the Abbot of Gloucester.

Background 
Vale Royal Abbey had been founded on its present site by King Edward I in 1277. Although intended to be the biggest and grandest Cistercian church in Christian Europe, building work was very much delayed (Edward had vowed to found the house in 1263, but recurring political crises, his own crusade, and the Second Barons' War prevented any work whatsoever taking place at least 1270). Work progressed until the 1280s when the abbey's construction was once again delayed by national events; this time, Edward's invasion of Wales. The King took not only the money that had been set aside for Vale Royal but also conscripted the masons and other labourers to build his Welsh fortifications. By the 1330s the monks had managed to complete the east end of the church.

Thomas Ragon was elected abbot of Vale Royal in 1351, two years after the death of his predecessor, Robert de Cheyneston.

Rebuilding the abbey 
In 1353, Edward the Black Prince wished to "continue and complete the work begun by his great-grandfather." For this purpose, Thomas was granted a tenth of Cheshire's 5,000 mark fine (which the county had previously agreed to pay in exchange for delaying the eyre), and he also provided another 500 marks when he visited Vale Royal in 1358. Thus, the Abbot was able to continue the building works on the Abbey as his predecessors had done; these works were expected to take six years. However, the following year, in October 1359, during a massive storm, much of the nave (including the new lead roof put in place by only the last abbot) was blown down and destroyed. The destruction was comprehensive, ranging "from the wall at the west end to the bell-tower before the gates of the choir," whilst the timber scaffolding collapsed "'like trees uprooted by the wind."

Repairs slowly took place over the next thirteen years, and it was undoubtedly Abbot Thomas who was responsible for the "unique chevet of seven radiating chapels" that were installed, although the overall stature of the remodelled church was smaller than before. Abbot Thomas had personally contracted with the Master Masons completing the work: they would build the church while he would organise the construction of twelve chapels—and pay for them. However, Thomas does not appear to have adhered to the terms of the contract, as only three years later, the Prince of Wales had to order him to do so.

Royal service 

Thomas performed royal service when required (for example, in 1364 he took the fealty of John de la Pole) and also held a number of offices outside his abbacy. He was keeper of  Aberystwyth Castle's gate,  farmer of that town's subsidy, and rector of Llanbadarn Fawr, Powys, from early 1361. Under Thomas, the Abbey also received the advowsons of Lampeter and Llanbadarn Fawr church from a close advisor to Edward, the Black Prince. In 1360 these had been granted by King Edward III to the Prince of wales, who in turn granted them to members of his household—Peter Lacy, Richard Wolveston, John Delves and William Spridlington—who in turn "appropriated" them to Abbot Thomas. This was with the Prince's blessing, as it was intended to be a royal donation towards restoring the church after its earlier partial destruction. Llanbadarn Fawr was a wealthy church, whose rector was no mere rector; the wealth of his church almost gave him abbatial status. Henceforth, Abbot Thomas and his successors were declared to be "henceforth the true abbot of the church." The abbey's own chronicle, The Vale Royal Ledger Book, states that "the abbot himself being present, all the men aforesaid and the other tenants did their fealty in full court and acknowledged the said abbot to be rector of Llabadarn Fawr and their lord." Abbot Thomas visited the church in 1361.

Dispute with Gloucester Abbey 
The advowson of Llanbadarn Fawr church was to occupy much of Abbot Thomas' energies, as it became the locus of a dispute between Vale Royal and Gloucester Abbey, which later objected to the gift, as Llanbadarn Fawr had previously been a cell of Gloucester's.  The church was wealthy enough to make it worth quarrelling over: it controlled no less than ten chapels, and brought in an annual income of at least £120 per annum. Even though Vale Royal had received permission from the Bishop, the King and the Pope, Gloucester Abbey still objected, and the case was to drag on many years after Thomas' death 9not being resolved until 1399). The case was to cause ill-feeling within Vale Royal Abbey itself, as well as into North Wales. Even into the fifteenth century, Abbots of Vale Royal were unable to travel to Llanbadarn Fawr without fear of assault on occasions.

Death 
Abbot Thomas died in the summer of 1369, probably from pestilence, and in 1383 he was mentioned as being a "former" abbot around the time of the Black Prince. He was succeeded by Stephen, who, however, is not recorded in contemporary records as holding the office until 1374, so there may well have been another lengthy interregnum.

Notes

References

Bibliography 
 
 
 
 
 
 
 
 
 
 
 
 
 
 
 
 
 
 
 
 

14th-century English people
History of Cheshire
1360s in England
1350s in England
Abbots of Vale Royal Abbey